Amblystegiaceae is a family of mosses. It includes 20 to 30 genera with a total of up to 150 species. They occur nearly worldwide, growing in tropical, temperate, and subpolar regions.

These mosses are small to large in size and are yellow, green, or brown in color. Some are aquatic and some terrestrial. Most occur in wet habitat types. Many occur in substrates with a basic pH, but some grow in neutral to acidic substrates.

Genera
Genera include:

Acrocladium Mitt.1869
Amblystegium Schimp.1853 (e.g. Amblystegium serpens)
Apterygium Kindb.1885
Arvernella Hugonnot & Hedenäs2015
Callialaria Ochyra1989
Calliergidium Grout1929
Calliergon (Sull.) Kindb.1894
Campyliadelphus (Kindb.) R.S. Chopra1975
Campylidium (Kindb.) Ochyra2003
Campylium (Sull.) Mitt.1869
Campylophyllopsis W.R. Buck2009
Conardia H. Rob.1976
Cratoneuron (Sull.) Spruce1867
Cratoneuropsis (Broth.) M. Fleisch.1923
Donrichardsia H.A. Crum & L.E. Anderson1979
Drepanocladus (Müll. Hal.) G. Roth1899
Gradsteinia Ochyra1990
Hamatocaulis Hedenäs1989
Hygroamblystegium Loeske1903
Hygrohypnella Ignatov & Ignatova2004
Hygrohypnum Lindb.1872 [1873]
Hypnites Ettingsh.1855
Hypnobartlettia Ochyra1985
Koponenia Ochyra1985
Larrainia W.R. Buck2015
Leptodictyum (Schimp.) Warnst.1906
Limprichtia Loeske1907
Loeskypnum H.K.G. Paul1918
Microhypnum Jan Kučera & Ignatov2019
Neocalliergon R.S. Williams1930
Ochyraea Váňa1986
Orthotheciella (Müll. Hal.) Ochyra1998
Palustriella Ochyra1989
Pictus C.C. Towns.1983
Platydictya Berk.1863
Platyhypnum Loeske1911
Platylomella A.L. Andrews1950
Protoochyraea Ignatov1990
Pseudoamblystegium Vanderp. & Hedenäs2009
Pseudocalliergon (Limpr.) Loeske1907
Pseudocampylium Vanderp. & Hedenäs2009
Pseudohygrohypnum Kanda1976 [1977]
Richardsiopsis Ochyra1986
Sanionia Loeske1907
Sarmentypnum Tuom. & T.J. Kop.1979
Sasaokaea Broth.1929
Sciaromiadelphus Abramova & I.I. Abramov1967
Sciaromiella Ochyra1986
Sciaromiopsis Broth.1924
Scorpidium (Schimp.) Limpr.1899
Serpoleskea (Hampe ex Limpr.) Loeske1905
Sinocalliergon Sakurai1949
Straminergon Hedenäs1993
Vittia Ochyra1987
Warnstorfia Loeske1907

References

External links
Amblystegiaceae. Montana Field Guide.

Hypnales
Moss families